This is a list of all cricketers who have captained Kenya in an official international match. This includes the ICC Trophy, Under-19 games and One Day International. The tables are correct as of the 2007 Cricket World Cup.

One Day Internationals

Kenya played their first ODI on February 18, 1996.

T20 Internationals

Kenya played their first T20I in September 2007.

ICC Cricket World Cup Qualifier (ICC Trophy)

Kenya debuted in the ICC Trophy in the 1982 tournament

Youth One-Day International captains

This is a list of Kenyans who have captained their country in an Under-19's ODI.

External links
Cricinfo
 Kenya's ICC Trophy captains at Cricket Archive 
Kenya's Under 19's captains at Cricket Archive 

Captains

Captains
Kenya